Paudge Mulhare (born 1944) is an Irish former hurler and Gaelic footballer who played as a forward for both Offaly senior teams from 1965 until 1975.

References

1944 births
Living people
Dual players
St Rynagh's hurlers
St Rynagh's Gaelic footballers
Offaly inter-county hurlers
Offaly inter-county Gaelic footballers
Hurling managers